Ettore Ferrari (Rome, 25 March 1845 – Rome, 19 August 1929) was an Italian sculptor.

Biography

Born in Rome to an artistic family (his father was also a painter), Ferrari was one of the members of the artistic rebirth in the secular state born after the Italian Unification. For a long time, he was a professor at the Accademia di San Luca, a deputy in the Italian Parliament and Grand Master of the Grande Oriente d'Italia. the main Masonic body in Italy.

Ettore Ferrari and Pio Piacentini during 1884 provided the rough draft plans for construct a permanent monument, the Victor Emmanuel II Monument that celebrates Victor Emmanuel II of Italy (the first king of a united Italy) and that also commemorates "Risorgimento", the Italian unification that followed the military defeat and dissolution of the temporal Papal States empire.

In 1887, Ferrari created a statue of Ovid for the city of Constanţa, Romania (the ancient Tomis, where the Latin poet was exiled) and this statue has been duplicated in 1925 for Sulmona, Ovid's birthplace. Another important work is the bronze statue of Giuseppe Garibaldi, created in 1892, located in Pisa in the square with the same name.

Ferrari also sculpted the statue for the controversial Monument to Giordano Bruno in Campo de' Fiori, Rome.

Among his students was Ermenegildo Luppi.

References

External links

1848 births
1929 deaths
Artists from Rome
Italian Freemasons
20th-century Italian sculptors
20th-century Italian male artists
19th-century Italian sculptors
Italian male sculptors
19th-century Italian male artists